The Mistake River is a river of the Canterbury region of New Zealand's South Island. It flows south from the Hall Range to the northwest of Lake Tekapo, turning east at the southern end of the range to flow into the western edge of the lake.

See also
List of rivers of New Zealand

References

Rivers of Canterbury, New Zealand
Rivers of New Zealand